His Majesty's Ambassador Extraordinary and Plenipotentiary at Khartoum is the United Kingdom's foremost diplomatic representative in the Republic of the Sudan.

Heads of mission

Chargé d'affaires
1954–1956: Philip Adams
1994–1995: John Crane

Ambassador Extraordinary and Plenipotentiary
1956–1961: Sir Edwin Chapman-Andrews
1961: Sir Roderick Parkes
1961–1965: Sir Ian Dixon Scott
1965–1966: Sir John Richmond
1966–1967: Sir Robert Fowler
1967–1968: Break in relations due to the Six-Day War
1968–1970: Sir Robert Fowler
1970–1974: Gordon Etherington-Smith
1974–1977: John Phillips
1977–1979: Derrick Carden
1979–1984: Richard Fyjis-Walker
1984–1986: Sir Alexander Stirling
1986–1990: John Beaven
1990–1991: Sir Allan Ramsay
1991–1994: Peter Streams
1995–1999: Alan Goulty
1999–2002: Richard Makepeace
2002–2005: Sir William Patey
2005–2007: Ian Cliff
2007–2010: Dame Rosalind Marsden
2010–2012: Nicholas Kay
2012–2015: Peter Tibber
2015–2018: Michael Aron

2018–2021 Irfan Siddiq
2021-present Giles Lever

References

External links
UK and Sudan, gov.uk

Sudan
 
United Kingdom Ambassador